Rosa Miguélez Ramos (born August 27, 1953 in Ferrol) is a Spanish politician and Member of the European Parliament for the Spanish Socialist Workers' Party, part of the Party of European Socialists.

References

1953 births
Living people
Spanish Socialist Workers' Party MEPs
MEPs for Spain 1999–2004
MEPs for Spain 2004–2009
20th-century women MEPs for Spain
21st-century women MEPs for Spain
Members of the 3rd Parliament of Galicia